Ryan Considine (born January 23, 1984) is a former American football offensive tackle. He was signed by the Green Bay Packers as an undrafted free agent in 2008. He played college football at Louisiana Tech.

Considine has also been a member of the Las Vegas Locomotives.

1984 births
Living people
Sportspeople from Arlington, Texas
Players of American football from Texas
American football offensive tackles
Louisiana Tech Bulldogs football players
Green Bay Packers players
Las Vegas Locomotives players